

X
 XCLX - Xcel Energy
 XCWZ - Union Pacific Railroad
 XFEZ - Florida East Coast Railway
 XNWZ - Norfolk Southern Railway
 XOMX - Exxon-Mobil Corporation
 XRFZ - CSX Transportation
 XSCZ - CSX Transportation
 XSLZ - Soo Line Railroad
 XTRX - XTRA, Inc.; First Union Rail
 XTTX - Trailer Train Company

X